"Down to One" is a song recorded by American country music artist Luke Bryan. The song was co-written by Dallas Davidson with Justin Ebach and Kyle Fishman. It was the fourth single from Bryan's seventh studio album Born Here Live Here Die Here.

Background
"Down to One" was co-written by Dallas Davidson, a frequent collaborator and friend of Bryan. Upon hearing it for the first time, Bryan remarked "it just sounded like a big ol' hit", and that it was his wife Caroline's song on the album.

Critical reception
Billy Dukes of Taste of Country called the track an "easy radio hit". Lauren Jo Black of Country Now referred to it as a "sweet love song" and said it would "without a doubt, be a massive hit at country radio". Hannah Barnes of Popculture remarked that the track is reminiscent of Bryan's early hits with its "breezy, country-tinged production and romantic, summer-inflected lyrics".

Charts

Weekly charts

Year-end charts

Certifications

References

2020 singles
2020 songs
Luke Bryan songs
Songs written by Dallas Davidson
Songs written by Justin Ebach
Capitol Records Nashville singles